Carl Peterson (born 1943) is a National Football League team president.

Carl Peterson may also refer to:

 Carl Peterson (Australian footballer) (born 1987), Australian rules footballer
 Carl Peterson (One Life to Live), character on the soap opera One Life to Live
 Carl Jerrold Peterson (1936–1969), U.S. Navy officer
 Carl Peterson (American football) (1897–1964), American football player

See also 
 Carl Petersen (disambiguation)
 Carl Pettersson (disambiguation)